Sabato italiano (Italian Saturday) is a 1992 Italian drama film  directed by Luciano Manuzzi.

Cast 
 Francesca Neri: Marina 
 Chiara Caselli: Angela 
 Isabelle Pasco: Danielle  
 Stefano Dionisi: Ricky  
 Yvonne Sciò: Violante  
 Francesco Barilli: Roberto / The Boss
 Massimo Di Cataldo: Enzo

See also   
 List of Italian films of 1992

References

External links

1992 films
Italian drama films
1992 drama films
Films set in the 1990s
1990s Italian-language films
1990s Italian films